The Offspring World Tour 2017 was a concert tour by The Offspring, which began on March 23, 2017, in Nagoya, Japan and ended on November 25, 2017.

For the first time since he joined The Offspring in 1985, guitarist Noodles was absent from touring on the European summer 2017 dates, stating on Instagram that a "sudden family matter" forced him to stay in the U.S.A. Longtime live guitarist Todd Morse took his place as lead guitarist, while Sum 41 guitarist Tom Thacker played as second live guitarist.

To coincide with the 20th anniversary of its release, The Offspring played their fourth studio album Ixnay on the Hombre in its entirety during their appearance at Amnesia Rockfest.

Tour dates

Personnel
 Dexter Holland – lead vocals, rhythm and lead guitar
 Noodles – lead guitar, backing vocals (except on European dates)
 Greg K. – bass guitar, backing vocals
 Pete Parada – drums
 Todd Morse - lead guitar (on European dates), rhythm guitar, backing vocals
 Tom Thacker - rhythm guitar, backing vocals (on European dates)

References

External links
The Offspring's official website
The Offspring touring history

2017 concert tours
The Offspring concert tours
Concert tours of Europe